The Chratzerengrat (2,349 m) is a mountain of the Glarus Alps, located east of Muotathal in the canton of Schwyz. It lies north of the Pfannenstock.

References

External links
Chratzerengrat on Hikr

Mountains of the Alps
Mountains of the canton of Schwyz
Mountains of Switzerland